Lepidoptera of the Chagos Archipelago consist of both the butterflies and moths recorded from the islands of the Chagos Archipelago, a group of seven atolls comprising more than 60 tropical islands in the Indian Ocean. The archipelago consists of five emergent atolls, Diego Garcia, Egmont, the Great Chagos Bank, Peros Banhos and Salomon. There are also several submerged atolls and vast banks and shoals. The whole territory covers 54,400 km2 of the Indian Ocean, of which the archipelago covers about 37,500 km2. The Chagos Archipelago has been British territory since 1814 and was made a dependency of the United Kingdom in 1965.

According to a recent estimate, there are a total of 63 Lepidoptera species present in the Chagos Archipelago.

Butterflies

Lycaenidae
Petrelaea dana (de Nicéville, [1884])

Nymphalidae
Hypolimnas bolina (Linnaeus, 1758) (ssp. Hypolimnas bolina euphorioides)
Junonia villida Godart, 1819 (ssp. Junonia villida chagoensis)

Macro moths

Arctiidae
Brunia antica (Walker 1854)
Utetheisa pulchelloides Hampson, 1907

Geometridae
Comostola pyrrhogona (Walker, 1866)
Glaucoclystis immixtaria (Walker, 1862)
Scopula actuaria (Walker, 1861)

Noctuidae
Amyna axis (Guenée, 1852)
Amyna natalis (Walker, 1858)
Anomis sabulifera Guenée, 1852
Anticarsia irrorata (Fabricius, 1781)
Callopistria maillardi Guénée, 1862
Chasmina candida (Walker, 1865) (misidentified as Chasmina tibialis)
Chrysodeixis eriosoma (Doubleday, 1843)
Chrysodeixis illuminata (G.S. Robinson, 1968)
Condica conducta (Walker, [1857])
Eublemma cochylioides (Guenée, 1852)
Mocis frugalis (Fabricius, 1775)
Spodoptera litura (Fabricius, 1775)
Spodoptera mauritia (Boisduval, 1833)
Stictoptera hironsi Barnett, Emms & Holloway, 1998
Thyas coronata (Fabricius, 1775)
Thyas honesta Hübner, 1806

Nolidae
Garella nilotica (Rogenhofer, 1881)

Sphingidae
Acherontia lachesis (Fabricius, 1798)
Agrius convolvuli (Linnaeus, 1758)
Cephonodes picus (Cramer 1777)
Hippotion velox (Fabricius, 1793)
Macroglossum corythus Walker 1856

Micro moths

Cosmopterigidae
Labdia tentoria Meyrick, 1911

Gelechiidae
Brachmia autonoma Meyrick, 1910

Hyblaeidae
Hyblaea puera (Cramer, 1777)

Pterophoridae
Megalorhipida defectalis (Fabricius, 1793)
Lantanophaga pusillidactylus (Walker, 1864)

Pyralidae
Aethaloessa calidalis (Guenée, 1854) (ssp. Aethaloessa calidalis calidalis)
Achyra massalis (Walker, 1859)
Bradina admixtalis Walker, 1859
Cnaphalocrocis poeyalis Boisduval, 1833
Culladia admigratella Walker, 1863
Diaphania indica (Saunders, 1851)
Endotricha mesenterialis (Walker, 1859) (ssp. Endotricha mesenterialis mesenterialis)
Etiella grisea Hampson, 1903 (ssp. Etiella grisea grisea)
Eurrhyparodes tricoloralis (Zeller, 1852)
Galleria mellonella (Linnaeus, 1758)
Herpetogramma licarsisalis (Walker, 1859)
Hydriris ornatalis (Duponchel, 1832)
Lamprosema chagosalis T. B. Fletcher, 1911
Lamprosema niphealis Walker, 1859
Lamprosema salomonalis T. B. Fletcher, 1911
Mabra eryxalis (Walker, 1859)
Omiodes indicata (Fabricius, 1775)
Omiodes poeonalis (Walker, 1859)
Parotis suralis (Lederer, 1863)
1 undescribed Phycita species
Sameodes cancellalis (Zeller, 1852)
Spoladea recurvalis (Fabricius, 1775)
Sufetula chagosalis (T. B. Fletcher, 1910)
Sufetula minimalis T. B. Fletcher, 1911
Synclera univocalis (Walker, 1859)

Tineidae
Erechthias molynta (Meyrick, 1911)

Tortricidae
Adoxophyes privatana (Walker, 1863)
Dudua aprobola (Meyrick, 1886)
Thaumatotibia encarpa (Meyrick, 1920)

External links

A Preliminary List of Insects of Diego Garcia Atoll, Chagos Archipelago

Lists of butterflies by location
Lists of moths by location